Sinotaia quadrata is a species of a freshwater snail with a gill and an operculum, an aquatic gastropod mollusk in the family Viviparidae.

Subspecies
Subspecies within this species include:
 Sinotaia quadrata quadrata
 Sinotaia quadrata histrica (Gould, 1859) or as a separate species Sinotaia histrica
 Viviparus quadratus disparis
 Viviparus quadratus grahami Chen, 1945

Distribution 
This species is found in
 Japan
 Northeast Thailand（Isan）
 China.
 Italy (river Arno)
 Argentina (Central Argentina; non-native)

This species is also known from Upper Pleistocene of China.

Ecology

Habitat 
The habitat of Sinotaia quadrata are rivers and lakes.

The pollution tolerance value is 6 (on scale 0–10; 0 is the best water quality, 10 is the worst water quality).

Feeding habits
Sinotaia quadrata feeds on epiphytic algae.

Sinotaia quadrata histrica snails predate also on eggs of bluegill Lepomis macrochirus.

Life cycle
Sinotaia quadrata has strong fecundity.

Parasites
Parasites of Sinotaia quadrata (also of Bellamya quadrata lapillorum (Heude)) include trematode Aspidogaster conchicola.

Human use 
Sinotaia quadrata is common animal food used in aquaculture to feed fish black carp in China.

This species is also eaten by humans. In Isan, Thailand they are collected by hand or with a handnet from canals, swamps, ponds and flooded rice paddy fields during the rainy season. During the dry season, snails live under dried mud. Collectors use a spade to scrape the ground to find and catch them. Generally they are collected by both men and women. The snails are then cleaned and cooked in a curry. They are also parboiled in salted water and eat together with green papaya salad.

References 
This article incorporates CC-BY-2.0 text from reference.

External links

Viviparidae
Taxa named by William Henry Benson
Gastropods described in 1842